Twelve Tribes is an album by the American musician Richard Souther, released in 1990 on the Narada Equinox label.

Reception
In a contemporaneous review, Jim Aikin described the album as "terrific".  He also noted that "Souther's compositional touch is unfaltering", giving specific praise to the "Compañero" track.

Linda Kohanov's review at AllMusic noted a "marked evolution in style" from previous albums, and commented that "Souther's creative use of ethnic rhythms and instruments adds a new level of sophistication to his accessibility".

Track listing
(all songs written by Richard Souther except as noted)
City Lights/Western Sky - 4:19
Simple Joys - 4:13
Trade Winds - 5:15
Native Shores - 2:50
Compañero (Richard Souther / Eric Persing) - 3:55
Go The Distance - 3:31
Twelve Tribes - 4:36
All in Good Time - 4:54
The Summit - 5:21
Hands Held Apart - 3:17

Personnel
Richard Souther - piano, synthesizers, samplers
Abraham Laboriel - bass
Efrain Toro - percussion
Justo Almario - saxophone
Steve Tavaglione - EWI, violin
Randy Mitchell - guitar

References

External links
Richard Souther/Twelve Tribes at AllMusic
Richard Souther/Twelve Tribes at Discogs

1990 albums
Narada Productions albums